Hotel Astoria is a five-star hotel in Saint Petersburg, Russia, that first opened in December 1912. It has 213 bedrooms, including 52 suites, and is located on Saint Isaac's Square, next to Saint Isaac's Cathedral and across from the historic Imperial German Embassy. Hotel Astoria, along with its neighboring sister hotel, Angleterre Hotel, is owned and managed by Rocco Forte Hotels. The hotel underwent a complete refurbishment in 2012.

History
The building (originally a four-story apartment building) was bought by the English joint-stock company Palace Hotel to turn it into a hotel with European quality standards. It was designed by Russian-Swedish architect Fyodor Lidval, who developed a style based on Art Nouveau and also influenced by Neoclassical architecture. The hotel was constructed by the German firm of Wais and Freitag.

It was built to host tourists visiting Russia for the Romanov tercentenary, a huge celebration of 300 years of Russian imperial rule in May 1913. Hotel Astoria opened on December 23, 1912. The luxurious hotel was used during the celebrations to house guests of the imperial family, and was afterwards popular with the aristocracy. Rasputin was said to stay there with some of his married lovers.

After the Russian Revolution, the Hotel Astoria housed members of the Communist Party. Lenin spoke from its balcony in 1919. During World War II, the hotel served as a field hospital during the Siege of Leningrad. There is a legend that Adolf Hitler reportedly planned to hold a victory banquet in the hotel's Winter Garden. He was so convinced Leningrad would fall quickly that invitations to the event were printed in advance.

The hotel was managed by the state-run Intourist group during the Soviet period, until it closed in 1987 for renovations. It reopened in 1989, completely restored. Rocco Forte Hotels purchased the hotel in December 1997 and spent $20 million on further renovations. The hotel was renovated again in 2012 for its centennial.

Rocco Forte Hotels also owns and manages the adjacent Angleterre Hotel. It is marketed as the business-class wing of its more luxurious sister, the Astoria. The upper guest room floors of the two hotels are connected.

In 2022, Hotel Astoria turned 110 years old.

Famous guests
The hotel's many famous guests have included Lenin, Isadora Duncan, H. G. Wells, Alexander Vertinsky, Prince Charles, Luciano Pavarotti, Madonna, Elton John, Jack Nicholson, Vladimir Putin, Alain Delon, Gina Lollobrigida, Marcello Mastroianni, Dmitri Hvorostovsky, Atal Bihari Vajpayee, Pierre Cardin, Jean Paul Gaultier, Margaret Thatcher, Jacques Chirac, Tony Blair and U.S. President George W. Bush.

Writer Mikhail Bulgakov spent his honeymoon at the hotel in 1932 and is said to have written parts of The Master and Margarita in room 412.

Awards 
2014

 Conde Nast Traveller Awards: inclusion in Top 100 Hotels and Resorts in the World by Conde Nast Traveller Awards

2015

 Conde Nast Traveller Readers’ Choice Awards Awards: Top 30 Hotels in Northern Europe №7

2017

 World Travel Awards: Russia’s Leading Luxury Hotel

2018

 World Travel Awards: Russia’s Leading Luxury Hotel

2019

Conde Nast Traveller Readers’ Choice Awards:

 Best Hotels in the World №15
 Top 10 Hotels in Europe №5
 Top 25 Hotels in Northern Europe №2

 GQ Travel Awards: the Best Historical Hotel in St Petersburg
 Hotel Astoria included in Top 100 Brands of St Petersburg by Delovoy Petersburg
 General Director Gerold Held recognized as Top Manager in Hospitality by Kommersant newspaper 
 General Director Gerold Held recognized as the Best Top Manager in Hospitality and included in Top 100 Managers of St Petersburg rating by Delovoy Petersburg 
 General Director Gerold Held recognized as The Man of the Year by St Petersburg Governments Awards in nomination “Tourism”

    

2020

 Condé Nast Traveler Readers' Choice Awards 2020: Top 25 Hotels in Northern Europe №2
 World Travel Awards 2020: Russia's Leading Hotel Suite - Tsar's Suite
 Inclusion in Forbes Travel Guide

2021

 Condé Nast Traveler Gold List 2021
 Conde Nast Traveller Readers’ Choice Awards 2021: Top 20 Hotels in Northern Europe №17
 World Travel Awards: Russia’s Leading Luxury Hotel
 General Director Gerold Held recognized as Top Manager in Hospitality by Kommersant newspaper 
 Hotel Astoria included in Top 100 Brands of St Petersburg by Delovoy Petersburg
 Different St Petersburg Award by Fontanka.ru and Committee for Tourism Development: Historical and Conceptual Hotel

See also

References

External links

Official website
Rocco Forte Collection Website

Astoria
Tourist attractions in Saint Petersburg
Saint Isaac's Square
Astoria
Astoria
Art Nouveau architecture in Saint Petersburg
Astoria
1912 establishments in the Russian Empire
Companies nationalised by the Soviet Union
Cultural heritage monuments of federal significance in Saint Petersburg